Sina Moridi; is an Iranian football midfielder who plays for Saipa in the Persian Gulf Pro League.

Club career

Foolad
He started his career with Foolad from youth levels. In Winter 2015 he joined to first team by Dragan Skočić and signed three and half years contract which keeping him at Foolad until 2018. He made his debut for Foolad on May 5, 2015 against Padideh as a substitute for Bahman Kamel.

Career statistics

Club

References

External links
 Sina Moridi at IranLeague.ir

Living people
Iranian footballers
Foolad FC players
1996 births
Association football midfielders
Association football fullbacks
People from Dezful
Sportspeople from Khuzestan province